Kimberly Ann Guilfoyle (born March 9, 1969) is an American television news personality and former prosecuting attorney in San Francisco. A Republican, she became an advisor to the 45th President of the United States, Donald Trump.

Guilfoyle studied at University of California, Davis, and the University of San Francisco School of Law, where she earned a J.D. degree. She became a prosecuting attorney in San Francisco and Los Angeles, California. She was an assistant district attorney in San Francisco from 2000 to 2004. Guilfoyle married Democratic politician Gavin Newsom. She was First Lady of San Francisco during Newsom's first two years as mayor of that city. He later served as governor of the state. Since 2018 she has been the girlfriend of Donald Trump Jr.

She worked at Fox News from 2006 to 2018, and co-hosted The Five on the network. She later joined America First Policies, a pro-Trump super PAC, to campaign for Republicans in the 2018 midterm elections.

Early life and education
Guilfoyle was born in San Francisco on March 9, 1969. Her mother was Puerto Rican and her father was born in Ireland and immigrated to the United States at the age of 20. She was raised Catholic. She grew up in the Mission District of San Francisco and in Westlake, Daly City.

Guilfoyle's mother, Mercedes, taught special education. She died of leukemia when Guilfoyle was 11. Her father, Anthony "Tony" Guilfoyle, was born in Ennis, County Clare, Ireland, and immigrated to the United States in 1957 at the age of 20. In 1958, while still an Irish citizen, he was drafted and spent four years in the U.S. Army. After being discharged from the army, Tony Guilfoyle took up work in the construction trades. He later became a real estate investor. Until his death in 2008, he was a close advisor to his son-in-law, then-San Francisco mayor Gavin Newsom.

Guilfoyle graduated from San Francisco's Mercy High School, and the University of California, Davis. She received her Juris Doctor from the University of San Francisco School of Law in 1994. While in law school, she interned at the San Francisco district attorney's office. She also modeled for Macy's and a bridal magazine.

She later studied at Trinity College Dublin in Ireland. While there, Guilfoyle published research in international children's rights and European Economic Community law.

Career

Law
After law school, Guilfoyle taught in a public school district and briefly worked as a prosecutor in San Francisco. She lost her job in 1996 when Terence Hallinan was elected district attorney and fired 14 of the city's prosecutors.

Guilfoyle worked for four years in Los Angeles as a deputy district attorney, serving on adult and juvenile cases, including alleged crimes related to narcotics, domestic violence, kidnapping, robbery, arson, sexual assault, and homicide cases. She received several awards at the Los Angeles District Attorney's Office, including Prosecutor of the Month.

In 2000, Guilfoyle was rehired by Hallinan in the San Francisco District Attorney's Office, where she was an assistant district attorney from 2000 to 2004. During this time she obtained a conviction while co-prosecuting with James Hammer in the 2002 case People v. Noel and Knoller, a second-degree murder trial involving a dog mauling; it received international attention.

Media and politics

Television
In January 2004, Guilfoyle moved to New York to host the program Both Sides on Court TV. In addition, she worked as a legal analyst on Anderson Cooper 360°.

She joined Fox News in February 2006 as host of the weekend show The Lineup. This was eventually canceled. Guilfoyle remained a regular contributor for the network, and in 2011 was picked as co-host of The Five. She worked as a host on the show until 2018.

In 2014, she began hosting and then co-hosting Outnumbered for nearly fifty episodes, plus a few more appearances until June 2018. Guilfoyle also appeared weekly on the recurring segment "Is It Legal?" on The O'Reilly Factor, until that show was cancelled in 2017, and as a weekly Thursday guest on Brian Kilmeade's Kilmeade and Friends radio show. Guilfoyle guest-hosted Hannity, On the Record, Justice with Judge Jeanine, and Fox and Friends.

In mid-2017, Guilfoyle signed a long-term contract extension with Fox. A year later, in July 2018, Guilfoyle abruptly left Fox News; she began working for a pro-Donald Trump super PAC. HuffPost reported that, at the time of her departure, the network had been in the midst of a year-long investigation of a sexual harassment accusation against Guilfoyle. Network officials had given Guilfoyle an ultimatum: resign by the end of July or be fired. The New Yorker Truth Police subsequently corroborated reports that Guilfoyle had been forced to resign rather than leaving by choice.

After Guilfoyle left, Fox News agreed to an out-of-court settlement with an assistant who had accused Guilfoyle of sexual harassment. Terms were not disclosed. The New Yorker reported that the settlement was at least $4 million. The assistant alleged that Guilfoyle frequently displayed herself naked, showed photographs of the genitalia of men she had sex with, and required her to sleep over at Guilfoyle's apartment. The New Yorker independently verified several of the assistant's allegations.

Writing
In 2015, Guilfoyle published a semi-autobiographical advice book, titled Making the Case: How to Be Your Own Best Advocate, on her experiences growing up, working as a prosecutor, and encouraging people to advocate for themselves.

Trump administration and Trump 2020 campaign
 In December 2016, it was reported that Guilfoyle was being considered for the position of press secretary for President Donald Trump. Sean Spicer was considered the front-runner for the position and was ultimately selected. On the May 12, 2017, edition of The Five, co-host Bob Beckel hinted that Guilfoyle turned the job down. However, in an interview with Bay Area News Group on May 15, 2017, Guilfoyle confirmed she was in contact with the White House about the position following Spicer's resignation. "I'm a patriot, and it would be an honor to serve the country", Guilfoyle said. "I think it'd be a fascinating job, it's a challenging job, and you need someone really determined and focused, a great communicator in there with deep knowledge to be able to handle that position." However, on May 19, Guilfoyle said she was under contract with Fox, indicating she turned the White House down. One month later, she extended her contract with Fox.

In 2018, The Washington Post described Guilfoyle as a "conservative cheerleader for President Trump".

 In 2019, Donald Jr. and she jointly toured campuses, invited by venues such as the University of Florida, where they were paid $50,000 from student fees for their appearance. This generated controversy among persons who opposed Trump and paying so much to two of his spokepersons. Two people were arrested and five more injured at the event. Two years earlier, white nationalist Trump supporter Richard B. Spencer had preceded them as an invited speaker, generating similar controversy.

In 2020, Guilfoyle was reported to be the chair of the finance committee of the Trump Victory Committee. As of early 2020, the Trump campaign was secretly paying Guilfoyle $15,000 per month through the campaign manager's private company, Parscale Strategy. Guilfoyle served as a surrogate on the stump and took on broad advisory roles. In the Trump 2020 campaign, Guilfoyle managed a fund-raising division. This division paid socialite Somers Farkas to raise money. The fundraising division managed by Guilfoyle was in internal turmoil amid departures of experienced staff and accusations of irresponsible spending.

In August 2020, at the Republican National Convention, Guilfoyle gave a speech endorsing Trump that was widely described by some observers as unnecessarily loud or unhinged. Others in media described it as passionate. She was criticized for describing herself as a first-generation American when her mother was from Puerto Rico and thus an American citizen. She is a first generation American on her father's side, as he immigrated here from Ireland.

In January 2021, Guilfoyle joined President Trump, Donald Jr., Rudy Giuliani, Eric Trump, and others on the Ellipse in Washington, D.C. to address the "Save America March". This resulted in the attack on the Capitol. Having raised millions of dollars to support the rally, Guilfoyle was also involved in organizing the protest at the Capitol. She was paid $60,000 for her 2-3 minute rally speech.

Guilfoyle was featured in a video screened at the rally by Donald Jr., "break[ing] into the hip-shaking dance she's been showcasing at other recent pro-Trump rallies" and "tell[ing] Trump fans: 'Have the courage to do the right thing! Fight!'".

Personal life
In 2001, Guilfoyle married politician Gavin Newsom, then a San Francisco city supervisor. Newsom was elected mayor of San Francisco in 2003. While married to Newsom, she used the name Kimberly Guilfoyle Newsom. The couple appeared in the September 2004 issue of Harper's Bazaar; the spread had them posed at the Getty Villa, and they were referred to in the title as the "New Kennedys". In January 2005, citing the strain of a bicoastal marriage, Guilfoyle and Newsom jointly filed for divorce. Their divorce was final on February 28, 2006.

On May 27, 2006, in Barbados, Guilfoyle married furniture heir Eric Villency. Guilfoyle gave birth to their son in 2006. In June 2009, Guilfoyle and Villency announced that they were separating; their divorce was finalized later that year.

In June 2018, Vanessa Trump, who had filed for divorce from Donald Trump Jr. three months earlier, confirmed that Guilfoyle was dating Donald Trump Jr. The Trumps' divorce was final in 2018.

In mid-2019, Guilfoyle and Trump Jr. jointly purchased a $4.4 million home in The Hamptons. They sold it in March 2021 during the COVID-19 pandemic for $8.14 million. In March 2021, Guilfoyle and Trump Jr. jointly purchased a $9.7 million home in Jupiter, Florida. Guilfoyle and Trump became engaged on December 31, 2020. The news of the engagement was not made public until January 2022.

See also
 Puerto Ricans in New York City

References

External links

 
 

1969 births
Alumni of Trinity College Dublin
American journalists of Puerto Rican descent
American people of Irish descent
American political commentators
Catholics from California
American television journalists
American women lawyers
American women television journalists
California Republicans
CNN people
District attorneys in California
First ladies and gentlemen of San Francisco
Fox News people
Hispanic and Latino American people in television
Hispanic and Latino American women journalists
Living people
Mass media people from California
Newsom family
University of California, Davis alumni
University of San Francisco School of Law alumni
Latino conservatism in the United States